Eddie J. Lambert is an American attorney and politician from the state of Louisiana. A Republican, Lambert has represented the 18th district in the Louisiana State Senate since 2016. Lambert previously served in the Louisiana House of Representatives for the 59th district from 2003 until 2016.

Prior to serving in elected office, Lambert worked as an assistant district attorney from 1985 until 1990. He continues to work as a self-employed attorney in Gonzales.

Lambert was unopposed for re-election in 2019; he has not faced an opponent from either party since his first election in 2003.

References

Living people
People from Ascension Parish, Louisiana
Republican Party Louisiana state senators
Republican Party members of the Louisiana House of Representatives
21st-century American politicians
Louisiana State University alumni
Year of birth missing (living people)